Cape Kinnes is a cape which forms the western extremity of Joinville Island, off the northeast end of the Antarctic Peninsula. It was named by members of the Dundee whaling expedition 1892–93, for Robert Kinnes, sponsor of the expedition.

References

Headlands of the Joinville Island group